Jacqueline van Rysselberghe Herrera (born February 3, 1965) is a Chilean surgeon and politician. She is a member of the right-wing party Independent Democratic Union (UDI) was National Senator from 2014 to 2022.

She was mayor of Concepción from 2000 until her resignation in March 2010 to take the office of Intendant of the Biobío Region. Previously, she had been a city council member since 1992. On April 3, 2011 she resigned as Intendant.

Family 
Her surname comes from Flanders, Belgium. Her grandfather was François van Rysselberghe. Her great grandfather was Max van Rysselberghe, an engineer who left Belgium when he was about 20 years old on what was originally planned to be a six-month-long scientific expedition to Antarctica. The expedition lasted two years. Reports of her connection to the Pierre Van Rysselberghe dynasty are, at this point, unverified. During the first year, plans to return to Europe were abandoned when the ice in the waterways failed to thaw during the summer. In Belgium, Max met Isabel Martin, the daughter of Valentin Martin, Chilean Minister of Public Works, who at that time had escaped to Belgium after the coup in Chile. Max and Isabel were married in Europe, and in 1905 left for Chile. This couple had four children, Lydia, Yvonne, and Henry, the grandfather of Jacqueline and Daniel.

Controversy 

On January 23, 2017 an investigative report published by the news agency Ciper Chile disclosed a series of email exchanges which had happened in 2014 between Jacqueline van Rysselberghe and Luis Felipe Moncada, President of ASIPES (Fishing Industry Association of the Bío Bío Region) while she was presiding the Senate Fishing Committee. That committee was discussing a law that would benefit smaller, artisan fishermen so it was opposed by ASIPES. In those emails, Moncada gave explicit instructions to the Senator on how to act in the committee, including clauses to put in the law. Former assistant to the Senator Joel Chávez declared to prosecutors on August 4, 2016 that van Rysselberghe had been receiving monies from ASIPES since the municipal elections of 2000, when she was first elected Mayor of Concepción. The Senator confirmed the existence of the email exchanges but declared "it had not influenced legislative work."

References 

1965 births
Chilean people of Flemish descent
Chilean people of Dutch descent
Living people
University of Concepción alumni
Independent Democratic Union politicians
Intendants of Biobío Region
Women mayors of places in Chile
Mayors of places in Chile
People from Concepción, Chile
Members of the Senate of Chile
Opus Dei members
Candidates for President of Chile
Women members of the Senate of Chile
Chilean anti-communists
Senators of the LV Legislative Period of the National Congress of Chile